Cotswold is a local government district in Gloucestershire, England.  It is named after the wider Cotswolds region. Its main town is Cirencester. Other notable towns include Tetbury, Moreton-in-Marsh, Stow-on-the-Wold and Chipping Campden. Notable villages in the district include Bourton-on-the-Water, Blockley, Kemble and Upper Rissington among other villages and hamlets in the district. Cotswold District Council is composed of 34 councillors elected from 32 wards.

It was formed on 1 April 1974 by the merger of the urban district of Cirencester with Cirencester Rural District, North Cotswold Rural District, Northleach Rural District, and Tetbury Rural District. The population of the Cotswold District in the 2011 Census was 83,000.

Eighty per cent of the district lies within the River Thames catchment area, with the Thames itself and several tributaries including the River Windrush and River Leach running through the district. Lechlade in an important point on the river as the upstream limit of navigation. In the 2007 floods in the UK, rivers were the source of flooding of 53 per cent of the locations affected and the Thames at Lechlade reached record levels with over 100 reports of flooding.

The District is spread over 450 square miles, with some 80% of the land located within the Cotswold Area of Outstanding Natural Beauty. The much larger area referred to as the Cotswolds encompasses nearly 800 square miles, over five counties: Gloucestershire, Oxfordshire, Warwickshire, Wiltshire, and Worcestershire. This large Area of Outstanding Natural Beauty had a population of 139,000 in 2016.

Political control 
Since the first elections to the council in 1973 political control of the council has been held by the following parties:

Leadership 
The leaders of the council since the post was created in 2001 have been:

Chairs of the Council

Responsibilities

The law requires councils to provide some services. Councils decide the amount of resources given to these depending on the level of need or risk they present.

The statutory functions of Cotswold District Council include: 

Organising local and national elections
Local plans and development management
Building control
Housing policy and homelessness prevention
Housing benefits
Environmental health
Council Tax and Non-Domestic Rates collection
Waste and recycling 
Street cleansing
Street name plates (Street signs)
Food safety and water sampling
Health, safety and licensing

Cotswold District Council also provides a number of discretionary services:

Managing some car parks
Promoting economic development
Tourism, culture and events
Providing some leisure facilities
Providing some grants to voluntary organisations

Cabinet
Joe Harris appointed the following Cabinet in May 2022.

Current councillors

There are 34 councillors. After the May 2019 election, there are 18 Liberal Democrats, 14 Conservatives, one independent and one Green.

May 2019 local elections result dispute 
Nigel Adams, Cotswold District Council's returning officer and its "head of paid services" reportedly decided a tied result between two candidates in the Tetbury Town ward by allocating a spoiled ballot paper that had the word "BREXIT" written across it in favour of the Conservative candidate, Stephen Hirst.  The hitherto tied candidate, Independent David Painter, described it as a "travesty of justice" and said "no wonder people are turned off voting".  Painter sought to raise £2,500 to begin a legal challenge against the returning officer's decision.

References

External links
By-election results

 
Local authorities adjoining the River Thames
Non-metropolitan districts of Gloucestershire